The Gunslinger Part II is B-Real of Cypress Hill's second mixtape. It was released in the US in 2006 and features performance from him and his gunslinger trio Mellow Man Ace and Son Doobie together with guest appearances from several established hip-hop artists.

Track listing

See also
2005: The Gunslinger
2007: The Gunslinger Part III: For a Few Dollars More

References

External links
 [ The Gunslinger Part II: Fistfull of Dollars at Allmusic]

B-Real albums
2006 mixtape albums
Sequel albums